Hurricane Cosme was a minimal hurricane that threatened Hawaii in mid-July 2007. The sixth tropical cyclone, third named storm and first hurricane of the 2007 Pacific hurricane season, Cosme originated from a tropical wave that emerged off the coast of Africa on June 27 and tracked westward before emerging in the eastern Pacific. A system along the wave organized, and it was classified as a tropical depression on July 14, a tropical storm on July 15, and a hurricane on July 16. Cosme reached peak intensity as a Category 1 hurricane on the Saffir-Simpson Hurricane Scale, but quickly weakened due to cooler waters. Steadily decreasing in strength, the storm was downgraded to a tropical depression before passing to the south of the Hawaiian Islands. The depression crossed into the Central Pacific and degenerated into a remnant low by July 23.

Because Cosme stayed far from land, effects were mostly minor. No fatalities or injuries were reported, and only minimal damage occurred.

Meteorological history

The origins of Cosme can be traced back to a tropical wave that left the coast of Africa on June 27, 2007. Due to a lack of associated convection, the wave was difficult to track across the Atlantic Ocean and Caribbean Sea. The National Hurricane Center (NHC) estimated that the wave emerged into the Pacific Ocean on July 8. Because the system was embedded within the Intertropical Convergence Zone (ITCZ), development was initially slow. However, when it separated from the ITCZ on July 13, the disturbance increased in convective organization, and was classified as Tropical Depression Six-E about midway between Mexico and Hawaii. It tracked westward at  due to steering currents of a tropical easterly flow. Although wind shear was generally light, ocean temperatures were only marginal for tropical cyclone intensification. Forecasters experienced difficulty in locating the exact center of circulation. By July 14, convection had steadily decreased, although the storm's movement was initially uncertain due to its location within a broad low pressure area. Early on July 15 the depression's appearance on satellite imagery improved, and at 1800 UTC the NHC upgraded the depression to tropical storm status, and gave it the name "Cosme".

Shortly after attaining tropical storm status, the previously-broad circulation consolidated as banding features developed. The inner core gradually condensed and tightened, as indicated by an AMSR-E overpass. The hurricane reached peak intensity with winds of 75 mph (120 km/h), although due to cooler waters it quickly weakened to a tropical storm, as the eye became ragged and cloud-filled.

By July 17, the cloud pattern had deteriorated, and its winds decreased to 45 mph (75 km/h). The center subsequently became exposed, with just a few thunderstorms confined to the southwest portion of the storm as it began to accelerate to the west. As easterly vertical wind shear increased, convection temporarily reformed in a concentrated area southwest of the center. Gradually weakening, Tropical Depression Cosme passed south of the Hawaiian Islands on July 20 with a minimum central pressure of 1010 mbar. On July 22, the depression came within  of Johnston Island, and later that day, it degenerated into a remnant low.

Preparations and impact

Initially, Cosme was predicted to make landfall on Hawaii as a tropical storm. In anticipation of the storm, the National Weather Service issued a flash flood watch for the island of Hawaii on July 20. Also, small craft advisories were in effect for Maui and Hawaii; wind advisories were issued for summits in those regions. High surf advisories were also put into effect for coastal areas. The Hawaii County Civil Defense prepared for the storm by planning for increases in emergency response personnel and opening of evacuation centers. County crews worked to clean out drains and culverts to prevent flooding.

Because the depression stayed far from land, the effects were mostly minor and little damage was reported. The rainfall helped to relieve a persistent drought which had existed for several months. Wind gusts reached 40 mph (65 km/h) in southern portions of Hawaii, causing no known damage.

See also

 List of Hawaii hurricanes
 Other tropical cyclones named Cosme
 Timeline of the 2007 Pacific hurricane season

References

2007 Pacific hurricane season
Category 1 Pacific hurricanes
Hurricanes in Hawaii
2007 in Hawaii
Cosme

de:Pazifische Hurrikansaison 2007#Hurrikan Cosme
nl:Orkaanseizoen van de Grote Oceaan 2007#Orkaan Cosme